Morganza may refer to:

Morganza, Louisiana, incorporated village
Morganza, Maryland, unincorporated community
Morganza Spillway, flood-control structure in the U.S. state of Louisiana, near Morganza
A colloquial name for Western State School and Hospital in Pennsylvania